Today Is the Day is an American noise rock / avant-garde metal band originally formed in Nashville, Tennessee. The band's diverse sound combines influences from areas such as noise music, avant-garde metal, grindcore, post-hardcore, and alternative rock among other genres. Most of the band's recordings make extensive use of dissonance and sampling, as well as unusual production techniques and psychedelic overtones. Lyrical themes include depression, warfare, violence, altered states of consciousness, and mental disorders.

Members

Current

Former

Timeline
Timeline

References

External links
 
 Today Is the Day on Bandcamp
 Today Is the Day discography on Discogs

Today Is the Day